Pedro Gomes DeBrito (May 25, 1959 – July 5, 2014) was a soccer player who played as a midfielder. His career took him through multiple U.S. leagues including the North American Soccer League, Major Indoor Soccer League, American Soccer League and the National Professional Soccer League. Born in Portuguese Cape Verde, he earned one cap with the United States national team in 1983.

College
DeBrito, a native of Cape Verde, moved with his family to Portugal when he was nine. His family then moved to the U.S. when he was fifteen. After high school, he attended the University of Connecticut. He played as a forward on the men's soccer team and finished his four seasons with 43 goals and 59 assists. He holds the school's career assists record and, is fifth on the career goals list. In 1981, UConn defeated Alabama A&M 2–1 to win the NCAA Men's Soccer Championship. He was a 1980 Honorable Mention and 1981 First Team All American honors. The University of Connecticut inducted DeBrito into the school's Athletic Hall of Fame in 1999. He was inducted into the Connecticut Soccer Hall of Fame in the Class of 2000.

DeBrito was one of 22 college players to be part of the 40-40 club, having both 40 goals and 40 assists in their college career.

Professional
The Tampa Bay Rowdies of the North American Soccer League drafted DeBrito with the first pick in the 1982 NASL College Draft. That year he was the NASL Rookie of the Year as a forward. In 1983, the U.S. Soccer Federation, in coordination with the NASL, entered the U.S. national team, known as Team America, into the NASL as a league franchise. The team drew on U.S. citizens playing in the NASL, Major Indoor Soccer League (MISL) and dies and signed with Team America. When Team America finished the 1983 season with a 10–20 record, the worst in the NASL, USSF withdrew the team from the league and DeBrito returned to the Rowdies. However, he did not play for the Rowdies in 1984 as the team traded him to the New York Cosmos on April 26, 1984, for Refik Kozić and cash. While DeBrito played as a forward with the Rowdies and as a midfielder with Team America, the Cosmos used him as an outside back. DeBrito remained with the Cosmos through the 1984 NASL outdoor season. The league collapsed at the end of the season and the Cosmos jumped to MISL for the 1984–1985 season. However, the Cosmos did not last the season and DeBrito signed with the Dallas Sidekicks (MISL) as a free agent on September 10, 1985. On February 13, 1987, DeBrito injured his right knee putting him out for the remainder of the 1986–1987 season. He began the 1987–1988 season with the Sidekicks but the team attempted to trade DeBrito the Tacoma Stars for Godfrey Ingram. When the two teams failed to complete the trade, the Sidekicks released DeBrito due to salary cap considerations nine games into the 1987–1988 season. DeBrito then signed with Wichita Wings as a free agent. Later that season, he broke his right leg. In 1989, DeBrito played for the Albany Capitals of the outdoor American Soccer League.

DeBrito returned to the Dallas Sidekicks as a free agent in 1990 and remained with the team through 1991. On December 2, 1992, he signed with the Detroit Rockers of the National Professional Soccer League and played with the team until 1994 when he retired from professional soccer. He later spent time in Portugal before returning to the United States and settling in Miami where he continued to play for local recreational soccer teams.

National team
DeBrito earned his only cap in the U.S. national team's only game in 1983, a 2–0 win over Haiti on April 30, 1983.

Personal life
DeBrito's parents were John and Angelina DeBrito. He had five sisters: Vera, Fernanda, Valeriana, Angela, and Maria. His younger brother, John DeBrito, was also a professional soccer player in the 1990s and early 2000s. Pedro was the Boys Varsity Soccer Coach for the Oliver-Wolcott Technical High School in Torrington, CT in 1999.

DeBrito was critically injured in an automobile accident in Miami, Florida, on July 3, 2014, and died as a result of those injuries on July 5, 2014. He was on his way to work as a manager of the Drew Estate Cigar Company when the car he was driving hit a tree in the median.

References

External links
 UConn Soccer Records
 Dallas Sidekicks profile
 NASL/MISL stats

1959 births
2014 deaths
African-American soccer players
All-American men's college soccer players
Albany Capitals players
American people of Cape Verdean descent
American Soccer League (1988–89) players
American soccer players
UConn Huskies men's soccer players
Dallas Sidekicks (original MISL) players
Detroit Rockers players
Association football defenders
Association football midfielders
Association football forwards
Association football utility players
Major Indoor Soccer League (1978–1992) players
North American Soccer League (1968–1984) indoor players
National Professional Soccer League (1984–2001) players
New York Cosmos players
New York Cosmos (MISL) players
North American Soccer League (1968–1984) players
Tampa Bay Rowdies draft picks
Tampa Bay Rowdies (1975–1993) players
Team America (NASL) players
United States men's international soccer players
Wichita Wings (MISL) players
Road incident deaths in Florida
20th-century African-American sportspeople
21st-century African-American people
People from São Nicolau, Cape Verde
Portuguese emigrants to the United States
Naturalized citizens of the United States